RVCA is a Costa Mesa, California–based clothing company owned by Boardriders.

Etymology
The logotype for RVCA portrays the letter A without a crossbar, resembling an uppercase lambda (Λ). The 'V' character is really a "U". Occasionally "RVCA" is written in a different script or appears in art where it is clear that the true name is 'Ruca'. The name resembles the Greek ρούχα (uppercase: ΡΟὙΧΑ), pronounced , which means 'clothes' in English. The RVCA logo is based on the two chevrons, the V & the A, representing the brand's ethos "The Balance of Opposites" as stated by RVCA founder PM Tenore.

History 
RVCA was founded in 1999 by Pat Tenore and Conan Hayes, a professional surfer from Hawaii. Billabong International Limited purchased RVCA in July 2010. In 2018 Boardriders acquired Billabong International Limited, gaining the Billabong, Element, Von Zipper, RVCA and XCEL brands.

Culture 
RVCA is closely associated with skateboard, surf culture, Brazilian Jiu Jitsu (BJJ), and MMA. The company sponsors a skateboard and surf team. They also sponsor prominent BJJ competitors and prominent MMA fighters. RVCA clothing is found in skateboard/surf shops and numerous other shops.

Because of its art focus, RVCA is also associated with the street graffiti subculture. RVCA is involved with various contemporary art galleries such as KNOWN Gallery.

RVCA Training Center 
Because of its Brazilian Jiu Jitsu and MMA focus, RVCA founder Pat Tenore (who holds a black belt in Brazilian Jiu Jitsu) built a BJJ/MMA gym known as The RVCA Training Center. The training facility is located in Costa Mesa, California. The Head Coach is currently Jason Parillo.

Affiliated people

MMA 

 B.J. Penn
 Michael Bisping
 Cris Cyborg
 Rafael dos Anjos
 Rose Namajunas
 Tito Ortiz
 Luke Rockhold
 Vitor Belfort
 Marlon Vera
 Mackenzie Dern
 Gilbert Burns
 Sean Strickland

Brazilian Jiu Jitsu 

 Lucas Leite
 Marcus Almeida
 Guilherme Mendes
 Rafael Mendes
 Keenan Cornelius
 Jackson Sousa dos Santos

Boxing 
 Seniesa Estrada

Notable sponsored artists and sportspeople 
Among the artists sponsored by RVCA as part of the Artist Network Program (ANP) are Mark OBlow, Mark Mothersbaugh, Barry McGee, C. R. Stecyk, III, David Choe, Kelsey Brookes, KRK Ryden, Matt Gordon, Marlon Vera, and Tommy Guerrero.

Surf team  

 Kala Alexander
 Makua Rothman

Skate team 

 Greyson Fletcher
 Andrew Reynolds
 Curren Caples
 Kevin "Spanky" Long
 Christian Hosoi
 Mark Suciu
 Chase Walker
 Evan Mock

MMA fighters 

 Mackenzie Dern
 Rose Namajunas
 Fedor Emelianenko
 Aaron Pico
 Luke Rockhold
 BJ Penn
 Gilbert Burns
 Marlon Vera

E-Sports 
 Summit1g

Chefs 
 Matty Matheson

References

External links
RVCA.com
Boardriders Inc.

Clothing companies of the United States
Companies based in Costa Mesa, California
Swimwear manufacturers
Surfwear brands
Clothing companies based in Los Angeles
Mixed martial arts training facilities